Philippe Junot (born 19 April 1940) is a French venture capitalist and property developer, who was the first husband of Princess Caroline of Monaco. He has business interests in Paris, Spain and New York City.

Background and family
Philippe Junot is the son of Michel Junot, Deputy Mayor of Paris, former President of Maison de l'Europe, and Lydia Thykjær, the daughter of a Danish industrialist. His father worked as a politician for several years, including working with president John F Kennedy. Philippe is also  a descendant of the Duke of Abrantes, General Jean-Andoche Junot who led Napoleon’s troops into Portugal. The family name figures on the Arc de Triomphe in Paris.

Education and career

Junot started his career in the United States (he was an early investor in the Jack in the Box fast-food hamburger chain), and then formed a series of small start up companies in France, ranging from real estate to renewable energy. Junot is one of the founders of Access International Advisors Group (AIA Group), a hedge fund platform. He was among the large number of investors to be duped by Bernard Madoff's Ponzi scheme which collapsed in late 2008.

Marriages and children
In Monaco, he married civilly on 28 June 1978, and religiously on 29 June, Princess Caroline, eldest daughter of Rainier III, Prince of Monaco, and former Hollywood icon Grace Kelly. The couple were divorced on 9 October 1980. He married Nina Wendelboe-Larsen in October 1987, and they have three children:  Victoria, Isabelle and Alexis.  They separated in 1997. In 2005 Philippe Junot had a daughter in Paris named Chloé Junot Wendel with Swedish model Helén Wendel.

References

1940 births
Living people
Businesspeople from Paris
Venture capitalists
French people of Danish descent